Paula Björkqvist (3 January 1975 – 17 July 2006) was a Finnish politician of the Centre Party in Jämsä. She was stabbed 69 times by her husband, Jarmo Björkvist, in 2006. He received a life sentence but was later released on parole in 2020.

References

Centre Party (Finland) politicians
21st-century Finnish women politicians
Finnish murder victims
1975 births
2006 deaths